Japan Live '95 is a recording of a live concert performance by American heavy metal band Dokken at the Kosei Nenkin Hall, Tokyo, Japan in 1995.

Track listing 
 "Tooth and Nail" - 3:45
 "When Heaven Comes Down" - 4:06
 "Into the Fire" - 4:46
 "Kiss of Death" - 5:33
 "Shadows of Life" - 4:05
 "The Maze" - 5:14
 "Long Way Home" - 5:38
 "Breaking the Chains" - 4:13
 "Unchain the Night" - 6:26
 "Nothing Left to Say" - 4:48
 "I Will Remember" - 4:29
 "Alone Again" - 7:22
 "Mr. Scary" - 4:33
 "It's Not Love" - 8:23

Personnel
Don Dokken - vocals, guitar
George Lynch - lead guitar
Jeff Pilson - bass, backing vocals
Mick Brown - drums, backing vocals
Audio by Chris Raughley live sound engineer in 1995 for Dokken

References

Dokken live albums
2003 live albums
Sanctuary Records live albums
Sanctuary Records video albums
2003 video albums
Live video albums
Dokken video albums

https://www.discogs.com/Dokken-Japan-Live-95/release/7481454